This is an incomplete list of ghost towns in Alabama, United States of America

Classification

Barren site 

 Sites no longer in existence
 Sites that have been destroyed
 Covered with water
 Reverted to pasture
 May have a few difficult to find foundations/footings at most

Neglected site 

 Only rubble left
 All buildings uninhabited
 Roofless building ruins
 Some buildings or houses still standing, but majority are roofless

Abandoned site 

 Building or houses still standing
 Buildings and houses all abandoned
 No population, except caretaker
 Site no longer in existence except for one or two buildings, for example old church, grocery store

Semi abandoned site 

 Building or houses still standing
 Buildings and houses largely abandoned
 few residents
 many abandoned buildings
 Small population

Historic community 

 Building or houses still standing
 Still a busy community
 Smaller than its boom years
 Population has decreased dramatically, to one fifth or less.

Ghost towns

References

External links
Alabama Ghost Towns DigitalAlabama.com
Alabama Ghost Towns
Cahawba, Alabama
Alabama Ghost Towns - Treasure Quest Metal Detecting
Ghost Towns of Alabama - Digital Alabama

Alabama
 
Ghost towns